Paul or Pál Esterházy may refer to several members of the House of Esterházy:

Princely House of Esterházy
 Paul I, Prince Esterházy (1635–1713), poet, harpsichordist, and composer
 Paul II Anton, Prince Esterházy (1711–1762), Field Marshal and patron of music
 Paul III Anton, Prince Esterházy (1786–1866), Hungarian diplomat

Other family members
 Pál Esterházy (1587–1645), founder of the Zólyom branch

See also
Esterházy